Charles William Jones (December 24, 1834October 11, 1897) was a United States Senator from Florida. He abandoned the seat after an apparent onset of mental illness.

Early life, travel and career
Jones was born in Balbriggan, Ireland. His father was a British army surgeon who died when he was a child. In 1844, Jones and his mother immigrated to New York City. After attending school in New York City and St. Louis, Missouri, Jones moved to Louisiana (in 1848) and Mississippi before settling in Santa Rosa County, Florida in 1854.

Jones was admitted to the Florida Bar in 1857, moved to Pensacola, Florida and was appointed tax assessor for Santa Rosa and Escambia Counties. He married Mary Ada Quigley in 1861 and they had four children before her death in 1880.

Politics

In 1872, Jones decided to try his hand at politics as a Democrat but was defeated by William Purman in a bid to become a U.S. representative. In 1874, Jones won a seat on the Florida House of Representatives, winning by only five votes.

After gaining independent support, Jones made a second attempt at federal office and, this time, was successful.  He began his first Senate term in 1875 and was hailed as an early success and an example of resurgence for the Democratic party in the Reconstruction era. Although criticized for his speaking style, Jones was elected to a second term in 1881.

Permanent vacation
In the spring of 1885, Jones announced he was taking a vacation in Canada and Detroit, Michigan. When the Detroit vacation extended into early 1886, questions started to be asked and gossip ensued. The most popular story was that Jones was pursuing - or even stalking - a wealthy younger woman named Clothilde Palms and was refusing to leave Detroit without her.

By April 1886, the speculation was that Jones had become insane. Around that time, the Senate leadership started replacing him on various committees. Although that move drew vocal ire from Jones, he continued to live in Detroit. Florida newspapers were campaigning for Jones to be replaced but Florida's Governor Edward A. Perry refused to take any action, citing, among other things, the lack of concrete rules regarding a senator who would not work but had not been officially declared physically or mentally impaired. Instead, Jones' seat went unfilled until his term expired in March 1887.

Later life and death
After Jones' term – and salary – ended in 1887, his life quickly spiraled downward. By year's end, he had been evicted from his room in Detroit and reportedly became destitute. Doctors informed one of his sons that they would sign a certificate of insanity for legal purposes.

In spring of 1888, Jones had reportedly been reduced to common vagrancy. In May 1890, Jones' son was granted permission to have him restrained and a probate court was told that he conclusively suffered from monomania. Shortly thereafter, Senator Jones was taken into custody and brought to an asylum for the insane in Dearborn, Michigan where he stayed until his death over seven years later.

Despite rampant gossip and speculation about both his mental state and Clothilde Palms, Jones himself never spoke publicly about either subject.  The cause of his sudden decline remains a mystery.

Clothilde Palms married a Detroit surgeon in 1889 shortly before Jones was committed.

Charles W. Jones is interred in Pensacola, Florida.

See also

List of United States senators born outside the United States
List of United States senators from Florida
United States congressional delegations from Florida

References

External links

Charles William Jones at PoliticalGraveyard.com

"A Love-Mad Man": Senator Charles W. Jones of Florida by Judy Nicholas Etemadi at Florida Historical Quarterly at State University System of Florida

1834 births
1897 deaths
Politicians from County Dublin
Irish emigrants to the United States (before 1923)
Democratic Party United States senators from Florida
Democratic Party members of the Florida House of Representatives
19th-century American politicians
Florida lawyers
Deaths in mental institutions
19th-century American lawyers